Jessica Antiles (born December 25, 1996) is an American swimmer. Antiles was one of 24 swimmers who swam for Team USA at the 2017 Maccabiah Games, where she won two medals.

Personal life
Antiles grew up in South Orange, New Jersey, is the daughter of Seth and Janette Antiles, and is Jewish. She is a member of the Maplewood Jewish Center, where her father is president. Her mother Janette competed in the Maccabiah Games herself, in tennis, representing Venezuela.

Antiles graduated from Golda Och Academy in 2015. She continued her education at Columbia University, where she majors in psychology and competes on the varsity swimming team, graduating in 2019. In 2017, Antiles received an honorable mention by the College Swimming & Diving Coaches Association of America (CSCAA) as recognition for Scholar All-America.

Swimming career
Antiles has been competitively swimming since childhood, including competing for her hometown swim team, the South Orange Dolphins.

High school
In 2013 as a high school sophomore, she tied the prep championships record for the 200-yard individual medley with a 2:08.88 finish. The following year as a junior, Antiles broke the record in the event that had stood for 35 years with a time of 2:03.50. As a senior in 2015, Antiles once again broke the record, with a time of 2:02.63. In addition, at the 2015 championships, Antiles broke the 100-yard butterfly record with a time of 00:56.01, breaking the previous record of 00:56.85. These records were added to her other previous prep championships record in the 100-yard breaststroke with a time of 1:03.91. She also holds the Essex County meet record in the 200 IM with 2:02.62, along with the 100 freestyle with 51.47, and was the New Jersey record holder in the 200 IM with a time of 2:00.84, from March 2014 until December 2015.

Olympic trials
In 2014, at the CeraVe Invitational, Antiles qualified for the Olympic trials, finishing in second place in the 400-meter long course individual medley with a time of 26.93. Prior to her official qualifiers however, Antiles required surgery due to a sinus infection, which left her unable to swim for 75 days, impacting her training and resulting in her failure to qualify.

2017 Maccabiah Games
Representing Team USA at the 2017 Maccabiah Games, Antiles won the silver medal in the 400-meter individual medley with a time of 4:58.27 and a bronze medal in the 200 Individual Medley. She also had a fourth-place finish in the 200-meter backstroke with a time of 2:20.89 and 100-meter breaststroke with a time of 1:13.59. She also finished in 20th place in the 200-meter butterfly.

When asked about the experience Antiles stated: "this was one of the most amazing experiences of my life. It was such an honor and such a special opportunity to be able to compete in Israel among some of the greatest Jewish athletes in the word."

Israeli National Championship
In 2014, while living in Israel, Antiles won four gold medals during the Israeli National Championship. She won in all four events she competed in, which were the 200-meter individual medley, the 400-meter individual medley, the 800-meter freestyle, and the 400-meter freestyle.

References

Living people
Jewish American sportspeople
Jewish swimmers
Maccabiah Games medalists in swimming
Maccabiah Games silver medalists for the United States
Maccabiah Games bronze medalists for the United States
Competitors at the 2017 Maccabiah Games
Columbia College (New York) alumni
Golda Och Academy alumni
People from South Orange, New Jersey
Sportspeople from Essex County, New Jersey
Swimmers from New Jersey
1996 births
Columbia Lions women's swimmers
21st-century American Jews
21st-century American women